The New Zealand National Party leadership election was an election for the National leadership position in 2006 following the resignation of Don Brash.

Background
In November 2006, after months of speculation, Don Brash announced his resignation as leader of the National Party following the release of Nicky Hager's book The Hollow Men which focused on Brash's conduct as leader and his secret dealings concerning the Exclusive Brethren. Shadow Finance Minister John Key was picked by the media as most likely to win the leadership, though former leader Bill English appeared to be running again leading a faction of 10–14 MPs. A contest was avoided on the weekend before the contest where a deal was worked out that saw English withdraw in return for the deputy leadership and finance portfolio.

As a result, John Key was duly elected unopposed as Brash's replacement (with English as his deputy) and consequently became Leader of the Opposition.

See also
Shadow Cabinet of John Key

References

National Party leadership election
2006
November 2006 events in New Zealand
New Zealand National Party leadership election